The Polynesian Football Player of the Year Award, instituted in 2014 by the Polynesian Football Hall of Fame, is given annually to the most outstanding player of Polynesian descent at the high school, collegiate and professional levels of football.

The award was first established in 2014 and initially only recognized the best Polynesian college football player. The award was expanded in 2015 to recognize Polynesian professional football players and was expanded yet again in 2017 to recognize Polynesian high school football players.

Recipients

Collegiate winners

Professional winners

High school winners

References

External links
 

National Football League trophies and awards
College football national player awards
High school football trophies and awards in the United States
Awards established in 2014
2014 establishments in Hawaii